Sylvioidea is a superfamily of passerine birds, one of at least three major clades within the Passerida along with the Muscicapoidea and Passeroidea. It contains about 1300 species including the Old World warblers, Old World babblers, swallows, larks and bulbuls. Members of the clade are found worldwide, but fewer species are present in the Americas.

Systematics
The superfamily Sylvioidea was first proposed in 1990 in the Sibley–Ahlquist taxonomy of birds based on DNA–DNA hybridization experiments. More recent studies based on comparison of DNA sequences have failed to support the inclusion of some families such as Certhiidae (treecreepers), Sittidae (nuthatches), Paridae (tits and chickadees) and Regulidae (goldcrests and kinglets) but instead support the addition of Alaudidae (larks).

Some of the families within the Sylvioidea have been greatly redefined. In particular, the Old World warbler family Sylviidae and Old World babbler family Timaliidae were used as wastebin taxa and included many species which have turned out not to be closely related. Several new families have been created and some species have been moved from one family to another.

List of families
This list of 25 families is based on the molecular phylogenetic study published by Silke Fregin and colleagues in 2012. and the revisions of the babbler group by Cai et al (2019)
The family sequence and number of species is from the online list of world birds maintained by Frank Gill and David Donsker on behalf of the International Ornithological Committee (IOC).

 Nicatoridae: nicators (3 species)
 Panuridae: bearded reedling (1 species)
 Alaudidae: larks (98 species)
 Pycnonotidae: bulbuls (160 species) 
 Hirundinidae: swallows, martins (88 species)
 Pnoepygidae: cupwings (5 species) 
 Macrosphenidae: crombecs, African warblers (18 species)
 Cettiidae: Cettia bush warblers and allies (31 species)
 Scotocercidae: streaked scrub warbler (1 species)
 Erythrocercidae: yellow flycatchers (3 species)
 Hyliidae: hylias (2 species) 
 Aegithalidae: bushtits (13 species)
 Phylloscopidae: leaf warblers and allies (80 species)
 Acrocephalidae: reed warblers and allies (42 species)
 Locustellidae: grassbirds and allies (67 species)
 Donacobiidae: black-capped donacobius (1 species)
 Bernieridae: Madagascan warblers (11 species)
 Cisticolidae: cisticolas and allies (163 species)
 Babbler group:
 Sylviidae: sylviid babblers (34 species)
 Paradoxornithidae: parrotbills (37 species)
 Zosteropidae: white-eyes (146 species)
 Timaliidae: babblers, scimitar babblers (57 species)
 Pellorneidae: fulvettas, ground babblers (65 species)
 Alcippeidae: Alcippe fulvettas (10 species)
 Leiothrichidae: laughingthrushes and allies (133 species)

References

 
Bird superfamilies
Extant Oligocene first appearances